Deborah Heinrich (born January 11, 1969) is an American politician who served in the Connecticut House of Representatives from the 101st district from 2005 to 2011.

References

1969 births
Living people
Democratic Party members of the Connecticut House of Representatives
Women state legislators in Connecticut
People from Aberdeen, Maryland
21st-century American politicians
21st-century American women politicians